3370 or variant, may refer to:

In general
 A.D. 3370, a year in the 4th millennium CE
 3370 BC, a year in the 4th millennium BCE
 3370, a number in the 3000 (number) range

Other uses
 3370 Kohsai, an asteroid in the Asteroid Belt, the 3370th asteroid registered
 IBM 3370, a hard disk drive unit
 Texas Farm to Market Road 3370, a state highway

See also